John "Jock" Menefee (January 15, 1868 in Rowlesburg, West Virginia – March 11, 1953 in Belle Vernon, Pennsylvania) was a pitcher in Major League Baseball who played from  through  for the Pittsburgh Pirates, Louisville Colonels, New York Giants, and Chicago Orphans / Cubs.

Menefee became the first National League pitcher to pull off a successful steal of home, a feat which he accomplished against Brooklyn on July 15, 1902. He ended his career as the starting pitcher in a doubleheader against Pittsburgh on the 7th of September, not getting a decision in either game.

References

External links
, or Retrosheet, or SABR Biography Project

1868 births
1953 deaths
19th-century baseball players
Baseball players from West Virginia
Chattanooga Warriors players
Chicago Cubs players
Chicago Orphans players
Franklin Braves players
Johnstown Johnnies players
Johnstown Terrors players
Kansas City Blues (baseball) players
Louisville Colonels players
Major League Baseball pitchers
McKeesport Tubers players
Minneapolis Millers (baseball) players
Minor league baseball managers
New York Giants (NL) players
People from Rowlesburg, West Virginia
Pittsburgh Pirates players
Wichita Eagles players
Wilkes-Barre Coal Barons players